Shermaine Ross (born 20 July 1972) is a former Grenadian sprinter who competed in the Women's 400m competition at the 1992 Summer Olympics. She ran a personal best time of 55.49s in the heats but did not advance to the later rounds. She also represented Grenada at the CARIFTA Games earning 3 consecutive bronze medals from 1989 to 1991.

Competition record

References

1972 births
Living people
Grenadian female sprinters
Athletes (track and field) at the 1992 Summer Olympics
Athletes (track and field) at the 1995 Pan American Games
Olympic athletes of Grenada
People from St. George's, Grenada
Pan American Games competitors for Grenada
Olympic female sprinters